Tetramicra is a genus of flowering plants in the orchid family, Orchidaceae, native to the West Indies. Tetramicra canaliculata has also been reported from southern Florida, but these reports have been challenged.
Tetramicra is abbreviated Ttma. in the horticultural trade.

Most species are terrestrial, (the exception being T. malpighiarum) and lacking pseudobulbs (with the exception of T. bulbosa), with rigid, linear, terete or triquetrous leaves and a terminal inflorescence consisting of a slender few- to several-flowered peduncle. Pollinia eight, 4 larger and four smaller.

Species 
Species accepted as of April 2016:
 
 Tetramicra bulbosa Mansf. (1926) - Hispaniola, Jamaica
 Tetramicra canaliculata (Aubl.) Urb. (1918) - Florida (?), Hispaniola, Puerto Rico, Trinidad, Lesser Antilles 
 Tetramicra ekmanii  Mansf.  (1926) - Cuba, Hispaniola
 Tetramicra malpighiarum J.A.Hern. & M.A.Díaz (2000) - Cuba
 Tetramicra parviflora Lindl. ex Griseb. (1864) - Bahamas, Cuba, Hispaniola, Jamaica 
 Tetramicra pratensis (Rchb.f.) Rolfe (1889) - Dominican Republic
 Tetramicra riparia Vale, Sánchez-Abad & L.Navarro (2012)) - Cuba
 Tetramicra simplex Ames (1923) - Cuba
 Tetramicra tenera (A.Rich.) Griseb. ex Benth. (1881) - Cuba
 Tetramicra zanonii  Nir (2000) - Dominican Republic

References

External links 
 

Laeliinae genera
Laeliinae